This article lists players who have captained the Meath senior football team in the Leinster Senior Football Championship and the All-Ireland Senior Football Championship. Historically, the captain was usually chosen from the club that won the Meath Senior Hurling Championship; however, in recent years, the captain has been appointed by the manager.

List of captains

References

 
Meath